John Pickard may refer to:
 John Pickard (archaeologist) (1858–1937), University of Missouri professor of archaeology and art history
 John Pickard (politician) (1824–1883), Canadian businessman and politician
 John Pickard (composer) (born 1963), British composer of classical music
 John Pickard (British actor) (born 1977), British actor
 John Pickard (American actor) (1913–1993), American actor
 John Pickard (neurosurgeon) (born 1946), British neuroscientist
 John Pickard (writer) (1910–1995), Australian  writer, see From These Roots